Playin' for Keeps is an album by saxophonist Bunky Green recorded in Chicago and released by the Cadet label in 1966.

Reception

AllMusic reviewer Jason Ankeny stated "Playin' for Keeps draws on inspirations spanning from Tin Pan Alley to bossa nova to the British Invasion to forge a soul-jazz groove with its own distinct sensibility. Though rooted in bop, Bunky Green embraces both pop and avant-garde idioms as well, channeling his myriad influences to create a soulful and lithe sound with an impressive command of space and time".

Track listing 
 "Playin' for Keeps" (Edith Green) – 4:17
 "Yesterday" (John Lennon, Paul McCartney) – 3:39
 "What Can I Do" (Bunky Green, Esmond Edwards) – 5:43
 "Mi Compasion" (Edwards) – 4:09
 "My Man's Gone Now" (George Gershwin, DuBose Heyward) – 3:51
 "The Shadow of Your Smile" (Johnny Mandel, Paul Francis Webster) – 3:25
 "Brazilano" (Manuel Garcia) – 5:29
 "Mama Looka Boo Boo" (Fitzroy Alexander) – 4:32

Personnel 
Bunky Green - alto saxophone
Warren Kime, Paul Serrano – trumpet (tracks 6 & 8)
John Avant – trombone (tracks 6 & 8)
Kenny Soderblom – tenor saxophone (tracks 6 & 8)
Willie Pickens (tracks 1-6 & 7), Charles Stepney (tracks 6 & 8) – piano
Cleveland Eaton – bass
Harold Jones (tracks 1-5 & 7), Marshall Thompson (tracks 6 & 8) – drums
Eli Gutierrez – congas (tracks 6 & 8)

References 

1966 albums
Cadet Records albums
Bunky Green albums
Albums produced by Esmond Edwards